Rachel Matheson or Mathson may refer to:

Rachel Matheson, character in Under the Mountain (TV miniseries)
Rachel Matheson, character in Revolution (TV series)
Rachel Mathson, beauty pageant contestant